Pope Alexander may refer to:

Pope Alexander I, reigned 
Pope Alexander I of Alexandria
Pope Alexander II of Alexandria
Pope Alexander II (1010/1015 – 1073), reigned 1061–1073
Pope Alexander III ( – 1181), reigned 1159–1181
Pope Alexander IV ( – 1261), reigned 1254–1261
Antipope Alexander V ( – 1410), reigned 1409–1410
Pope Alexander VI (1431–1503), reigned 1492–1503
Pope Alexander VII (1599–1667), reigned 1655–1667
Pope Alexander VIII (1610–1691), reigned 1689–1691

See also 
Alexander Pope (1688–1744), English poet

Alexander